Flat Rock Dam may refer to the following structures:

 Flat Rock Dam (Michigan), a dam in the U.S. state of Michigan
 Flat Rock Dam (Pennsylvania), a dam in the U.S. state of Pennsylvania